The Lamentable Journey of Omaha Bigelow into the Impenetrable Loisaida Jungle is a 2004 novel by Edgardo Vega Yunqué.

The novel follows Omaha Bigelow, a 35-year-old failure, with whom Maruquita Salsipuedesa, a 15-year-old bruja, falls in love. She has her mother perform a "Ceremony of Enlargement" that makes him frequently irresistible to women, and picaresque, magic realist, erotic adventures follow.

Omaha Bigelow's narrative is frequently interrupted by authorial commentary, on topics including baseball, literary ethnic ghettos, racism, and U. S. warmongering.

Regarding the title: "Loisaida" is the Nuyorican pronunciation of "Lower East Side".

Reception
Reviews were positive in general, although some criticized the authorial intrusions.

Notes

References

2004 American novels
Novels set in New York City
Magic realism novels
Metafictional novels
Lamentable
The Overlook Press books